

The Max Planck Institute of Molecular Cell Biology and Genetics (MPI-CBG) is a biology research institute located in Dresden, Germany. It was founded in 1998 and was fully operational in 2001. Research groups in the institute work in molecular biology, cell biology, developmental biology, biophysics, and systems biology supported by various facilities.

Research 
The research theme of research at MPI-CBG lies in the fundamental scientific questions pertaining to organisation of biology at various scales: How do biomolecules organize in a functioning cell? How do cells form tissues? and How do tissues form organisms? The research in the institute encompasses many topics from molecular, cellular, and developmental biology as well as from biophysics. An incomplete list of individual topics follows: phase separation, neural development, cell division, lipid rafts, endocytosis, embryogenesis, regeneration, tissue and organoid development.

Organisation 
The MPI-CBG is headed by five tenured directors or group leaders – Anthony Hyman (UK) as managing director, Marino Zerial (Italy), Anne Grapin-Botton (France), Stephan Grill (Germany), Eugene Myers (US),  – and a chief operating officer (Ivan Baines). Together with the directors' groups, 23 independent research groups led by untenured principal investigators and about 21 facilities make up the work force of the institute. In total, the institute employs around 550 people of whom about half are not German. The flat organisation and the absence of department divisions fosters direct communication and a slim administration.

Networking 
The MPI-CBG is located in a hub of biomedical research institutes including research centers of the Technische Universität Dresden (TUD) such as, the Center for Regenerative Therapies (CRTD), the B CUBE - Center for Molecular Bioengineering as well as the University Hospital Carl Gustav Carus Dresden, the Medical Theoretical Centre (MTZ) and the BioInnovationsZentrum (BIOZ). The MPI-CBG has collaborations with its neighbouring research institutes and with other centres in the city like the Max Planck Institute for the Physics of Complex Systems (MPI-PKS). Together with the MPI-PKS and the TUD, the MPI-CBG founded the Center for Systems Biology Dresden (CSBD). This center develops theoretical and computational approaches to biological systems across different scales, from molecules to cells and from cells to tissues. The MPI-CBG is also part of DRESDEN-concept, a research alliance of the TUD together with the four major research institutions – Max Planck, Helmholtz, Fraunhofer, and Leibniz – and the research-active museums in Dresden. It also collaborates with institutions abroad. In addition, it operates an international PhD program together with the aforementioned neighbours.

References

External links 
 Homepage of the institute
 English portal of the Max Planck Society
 Homepage of the institute's international PhD programme

Molecular Cell Biology and Genetics
Genetics in Germany
Molecular biology institutes
Research institutes established in 1998
1998 establishments in Germany